The Aghanashini River (also historically the River Merjee) is a river located in India about 18 miles south east of Anjediva Island. The village of Aghanashini is to be found at the mouth of the river. The river Aghanashini originates at 'Shankara Honda' in the Sirsi city of Uttara Karnataka. The water from this river flows unobstructed through the Western Ghats range and then joins the Arabian Sea.

References

Rivers of the Western Ghats